Rommel Asenjo (born 19 August 1988) is a Filipino professional boxer. He is a former WBO Oriental minimumweight champion, as well as a two-time world title challenger. He is also known for his "exciting style which had seen him score a lot of early wins."

Professional boxing career
Asenjo rose to prominence with an initial 17–2 record, primarily fighting in his home province of Cotabato. He won his first title on 23 May 2009, defeating Tanzanian fighter Sadiki Abdulazizi by way of first-round TKO for the WBO Oriental minimumweight belt. He won his next six fights (including one title defense) before receiving his first world title shot. On 30 April 2011, Asenjo travelled to Mexico City and challenged Raúl García for his WBO minimumweight title. García dropped him in the third round.

After six more consecutive wins back home, Asenjo returned to Mexico four years later to challenge WBA (Super) and WBO flyweight champion Juan Francisco Estrada, this time in Mérida. He was quickly dispatched by the Mexican after his corner threw in the towel in the third round when his right eye swelled up.

Professional boxing record

| style="text-align:center;" colspan="8"|32 Wins (24 knockouts, 8 decisions),  7 Losses (4 knockouts, 3 decisions)
|-  style="text-align:center; background:#e3e3e3;"
|  style="border-style:none none solid solid; "|Res.
|  style="border-style:none none solid solid; "|Record
|  style="border-style:none none solid solid; "|Opponent
|  style="border-style:none none solid solid; "|Type
|  style="border-style:none none solid solid; "|Rd., Time
|  style="border-style:none none solid solid; "|Date
|  style="border-style:none none solid solid; "|Location
|  style="border-style:none none solid solid; "|Notes
|- align=center
|Loss
|align=center|32–7||align=left| Geboi Mansalayao
|
|
|
|align=left|
|align=left|
|- align=center
|Loss
|align=center|32–6||align=left| JC Francisco
|
|
|
|align=left|
|align=left|
|- align=center
|Win
|align=center|32–5||align=left| Marlou Sandoval
|
|
|
|align=left|
|align=left|
|- align=center
|Win
|align=center|31–5||align=left| Bimbo Nacionales
|
|
|
|align=left|
|align=left|
|- align=center
|Win
|align=center|30–5||align=left| Raymon Dayham
|
|
|
|align=left|
|align=left|
|- align=center
|Loss
|align=center|29–5||align=left| Moisés Fuentes
|
|
|
|align=left|
|align=left|
|- align=center
|Win
|align=center|29–4||align=left| Lyster Jun Pronco
|
|
|
|align=left|
|align=left|
|- align=center
|Win
|align=center|28–4||align=left| Michael Rodriguez
|
|
|
|align=left|
|align=left|
|- align=center
|Loss
|align=center|27–4||align=left| Juan Francisco Estrada
|
|
|
|align=left|
|align=left|
|- align=center
|Win
|align=center|27–3||align=left| Powell Balaba
|
|
|
|align=left|
|align=left|
|- align=center
|Win
|align=center|26–3||align=left| Michael Borja
|
|
|
|align=left|
|align=left|
|- align=center
|Win
|align=center|25–3||align=left| Brobro Languido
|
|
|
|align=left|
|align=left|
|- align=center
|Win
|align=center|24–3||align=left| Jonathan Ricablanca
|
|
|
|align=left|
|align=left|
|- align=center
|Win
|align=center|23–3||align=left| Jade Yagahon
|
|
|
|align=left|
|align=left|
|- align=center
|Win
|align=center|22–3||align=left| John Rey Lauza
|
|
|
|align=left|
|align=left|
|- align=center
|Win
|align=center|21–3||align=left| Arnel Tadena
|
|
|
|align=left|
|align=left|
|- align=center
|Loss
|align=center|20–3||align=left| Raúl García
|
|
|
|align=left|
|align=left|
|- align=center
|Win
|align=center|20–2||align=left| Ryan Rey Ponteras
|
|
|
|align=left|
|align=left|
|- align=center
|Win
|align=center|19–2||align=left| Rodel Tejares
|
|
|
|align=left|
|align=left|
|- align=center
|Win
|align=center|18–2||align=left| Jetly Purisima
|
|
|
|align=left|
|align=left|
|- align=center
|Win
|align=center|17–2||align=left| Geboi Mansalayao
|
|
|
|align=left|
|align=left|
|- align=center
|Win
|align=center|16–2||align=left| Jun Tasic
|
|
|
|align=left|
|align=left|
|- align=center
|Win
|align=center|15–2||align=left| Rocky Sardido
|
|
|
|align=left|
|align=left|
|- align=center
|Win
|align=center|14–2||align=left| Sadiki Abdulazizi
|
|
|
|align=left|
|align=left|
|- align=center
|Win
|align=center|13–2||align=left| Wutisak Sithsoei
|
|
|
|align=left|
|align=left|
|- align=center
|Win
|align=center|12–2||align=left| Marlon Villanueva
|
|
|
|align=left|
|align=left|
|- align=center
|Win
|align=center|11–2||align=left| Roel Honor
|
|
|
|align=left|
|align=left|
|- align=center
|Win
|align=center|10–2||align=left| Daryl Amoncio
|
|
|
|align=left|
|align=left|
|- align=center
|Win
|align=center|9–2||align=left| Denchailek Sithsoei
|
|
|
|align=left|
|align=left|
|- align=center
|Win
|align=center|8–2||align=left| Roel Honor
|
|
|
|align=left|
|align=left|
|- align=center
|Win
|align=center|7–2||align=left| Jetly Purisima
|
|
|
|align=left|
|align=left|
|- align=center
|Win
|align=center|6–2||align=left| Rodel Tejares
|
|
|
|align=left|
|align=left|
|- align=center
|Loss
|align=center|5–2||align=left| Suriyan Sor Rungvisai
|
|
|
|align=left|
|align=left|
|- align=center
|Win
|align=center|5–1||align=left| Juan Purisima
|
|
|
|align=left|
|align=left|
|- align=center
|Loss
|align=center|4–1||align=left| Ronelle Ferreras
|
|
|
|align=left|
|align=left|
|- align=center
|Win
|align=center|4–0||align=left| Quilber Cailing
|
|
|
|align=left|
|align=left|
|- align=center
|Win
|align=center|3–0||align=left| Noel Rosa
|
|
|
|align=left|
|align=left|
|- align=center
|Win
|align=center|2–0||align=left| Arvin Calledo
|
|
|
|align=left|
|align=left|
|- align=center
|Win
|align=center|1–0|| align=left| Ronnie Dumaran
|
|
|
|align=left|
|align=left|

References

External links
 

Living people
1988 births
Filipino male boxers
Mini-flyweight boxers
Light-flyweight boxers
Flyweight boxers
Southpaw boxers
People from Cotabato